Stony Island Avenue is a major street on South Side of the city of Chicago, designated 1600 East in Chicago's street numbering system. It runs from 56th Street south to the Calumet River. Stony Island Avenue continues sporadically south of the Calumet in the southern suburbs, running alongside the Bishop Ford Freeway, sometimes as a frontage road. It terminates at County Line Road on the border of Will and Kankakee Counties.

Points of interest

Running roughly parallel to the Illinois Central Railroad, Stony Island Avenue forms the western boundary of Jackson Park, former home of the World's Columbian Exposition of 1893 and current home of the Museum of Science and Industry. Buildings of the University of Chicago line its western side, as does the national headquarters of the historically black Alpha Kappa Alpha sorority. Between 59th and 60th streets the Midway Plaisance runs westward to connect Jackson Park to Washington Park a mile away. Shortly after leaving the Hyde Park neighborhood sits Hyde Park Career Academy at 63rd Street. The Barack Obama Presidential Center is slated to be built in Jackson Park across from the high school.

Stony Island becomes an extremely wide thoroughfare between 67th and 94th streets. At 71st Street there is a  Metra Electric Line Stony Island Avenue station. Just south of 71st was the famous Moo & Oink Grocery Store that closed its doors in 2011. At 73rd Street is the Nation of Islam's Mosque Maryam. At 75th Street is Jackson Park Hospital. Stony Island meets 79th Street, and South Chicago Avenue forming a major and large intersection, with the ramps of the Chicago Skyway overhead.  Adjacent to this intersection on 79th Street is the New Regal Theater famous as The Avalon, a Chicago Landmark.

At about 92nd Street, Stony Island passes to the west of the geographical feature for which it was named, a stony hill that was once an island when the glacial Lake Chicago covered the area thousands of years ago. Early pioneers gave this hill—located in the present day neighborhood of Calumet Heights, Chicago (also referred to as Pill Hill for the large number of doctors who used to live in the area), at —the name Stony Island because at a distance it looked like an island set in a tractless prairie sea. (See also the nearby Blue Island.) At the intersection with 93rd Street is the Bronzeville Children's Museum. It is the only African-American children's museum in the U.S. South of 103rd Street, Stony Island Ave. enters the heavily industrialized region of Lake Calumet.

At some points in the south suburbs, street signs for Stony Island Avenue are misspelled as Stoney Island Avenue.

Transportation
Stony Island Avenue is primarily served by the 28 Stony Island north of 103 Street. The 2 Hyde Park Express, 6 Jackson Park Express and 15 Jeffery Local serve the road for short segments.

The South Chicago Branch of Metra Electric has a stop at 71 St

Expressway
At its northern end, the road reverts to at-grade status.

During the 1960s, the expressway was to have been the southern terminus of Interstate 694, which also would have included an upgraded Lake Shore Drive in its routing. It was cancelled by 1979.

Exit list

See also

References

Streets in Chicago